C. pentaphylla may refer to:

 Canna pentaphylla, a garden plant
 Cleome pentaphylla, an annual wildflower
 Crotalaria pentaphylla, an invasive plant